Chrysomyza is a genus of ulidiid or picture-winged fly in the family Ulidiidae.

Species
Chrysomyza africana
Chrysomyza allomma
Chrysomyza anaglypha
Chrysomyza azurea
Chrysomyza chalybea
Chrysomyza flavipes
Chrysomyza longicornis
Chrysomyza obscura
Chrysomyza sericea
Chrysomyza tarsata
Chrysomyza violacea

References

 
Tephritoidea genera